The 2023 European Speed Skating Championships took place in Hamar, Norway from 6 to 8 January 2023.

Medal summary

Medal table

Medalists

Allround

Men's championships

500 m

5000 m

1500 m

10,000 m

Final ranking

Women's championships

500 m

3000 m

1500 m

5000 m

Final ranking

Sprint

Men's championships

1st 500 m

1st 1000 m

2nd 500 m

2nd 1000 m

Final ranking

Women's championships

1st 500 m

1st 1000 m

2nd 500 m

2nd 1000 m

Final ranking

References

External links
Results

2023
2023 in Norwegian sport
2023 in speed skating
Sport in Hamar
International speed skating competitions hosted by Norway
January 2023 sports events in Europe